Steven Wolk is the chief technology officer of P. C. Richard & Son. He graduated from New York Institute of Technology with a B.S. in Computer Science.

References

New York Institute of Technology alumni
Living people
Year of birth missing (living people)